Josephine Fitzgerald Clarke (pen name, Errol Fitzgerald; 1865 – 6 June 1953), was a prolific Irish romance novelist who published over 40 novels for Mills & Boon between 1927 and 1953.

Biography
Born Bridget Josephine Moylan to Jeremiah Moylan and Mary Fitzgerald of Cork, her mother was the matron and her father the headmaster of the Model School. Her father went on to become a Barrington Lecturer on Political Economy. She was one of ten children. Her oldest brother Michael became a doctor; her oldest sister a school governess and the youngest sister Vida Mary Augusta Constance Moylan (1871-1962) married William Worby Beaumont, an engineer and inventor. Her sister Hannah became the first woman to get a degree in Science in Ireland. In 1873 the family moved to Limerick where they were living when her mother died.

Clarke move to England where she went by Josephine Fitzgerald Moylan. In 1893 she became Lady Josephine Fitzgerald Clarke when she married Sir Frederick William Alfred Clarke (1857-1927), Accountant and Comptroller-General of HM Customs and Excise. Their children were: Eric Fitzgerald Clarke (1894-1917); Desmond Frederick Aubrey Clarke (1896-1984); Gerald Wilfred Francis Clarke (1899-1918), and Philip Edward Joseph Clarke (1907-1973). After her husband died in 1927, Clarke began writing romantic novels under the nom de plume Errol Fitzgerald. She published over 40 novels in the next twenty years.

In her later years she lived in Bedford Park in Chiswick.

Bibliography

 Harvests Of Deceit, 1929
 Jewels Of The Dark, 1929
 The Purple Stone, 1930
 Dear Hatred, 1930
 Storms Of Fate, 1931
 Gleanings Of Passion, 1932
 Kinsman For A Night, 1932
 The Path Of Chance, 1932
 The Spur Of Impulse, 1933
 Ungenerous Heart, 1933
 The Whispering Witness, 1934
 Converging Shadows, 1934
 Love Lies Deep, 1935
 Love In Chains, 1935
 Truth Is Whispered, 1936
 Arrows Of Chance, 1936
 The Nailed Door, 1937
 Storms At Sunset, 1937
 Doubly Deceived, 1938
 The Faithful Knave, 1938
 Errant Wife, 1938
 Hasty Repentance, 1939
 Love Has Eyes, 1939
 Tide Of Destiny, 1939
 Splendid Hope, 1940
 Prisoners Of Love, 1940
 A Fatal Name, 1941
 Flight From Marriage, 1941
 Ambition's Fool, 1942
 The Hidden Heiress, 1942
 Forbidden Flame, 1943
 The Secret Tenant, 1943
 Vengeance Tarries, 1944
 The Emerald Chain, 1946
 A Borrowed Coat, 1947
 Unwanted Daughter, 1947
 A Stranger Intervenes, 1948
 The Price of Silence, 1950
 Beloved Deceiver, 1951

References and sources

1865 births
1953 deaths
20th-century Irish novelists
20th-century Irish women writers
Irish romantic fiction writers
Pseudonymous women writers
20th-century pseudonymous writers